Qeshlaq-e Zakhor (also Romanized as Qeshlāq-e Zākhor; also known as Qeshlāq-e Zākhvor) is a village in Vargahan Rural District, in the Central District of Ahar County, East Azerbaijan Province, Iran. At the 2006 census, its population was 328, in 64 families.

References 

Populated places in Ahar County